

Paracryptodira is an extinct group of reptiles in the clade Testudinata (which contains modern turtles and their extinct relatives), known from the Jurassic to Paleogene of North America and Europe. Initially treated as a suborder sister to Cryptodira, they were then thought to be a very primitive lineage inside the Cryptodira according to the most common use of the latter taxon. They are now often regarded as late-diverging stem-turtles, lying outside the clade formed by Cryptodira and Pleurodira. The paracryptodires are said to have phylogenic relationships, noted as primary subclades, within the Baenidae and Pleurosternidae. Within each subclade, lies many biodiverse turtles that are continuously being investigated and added to the fossil record. Paracryptodires are divided into three main groups, Compsemydidae, known from the Late Jurassic to Paleocene of North America and Europe, Pleurosternidae, known from the Late Jurassic to Early Cretaceous of North America and Europe, and Baenidae, known from the Early Cretaceous to Eocene of North America. The latter two groups are more closely related to each other than to Compsemys, forming the clade Baenoidea.

Characteristics 
Paracryptodires have reduced prefrontal exposure on the dorsal surface of their skulls, reduced fenestrae perilymphaticae, and secondarily reduced supraoccipital crests. In the skull, the posterior foramen for the internal carotid canal is located midway along the basisphenoid-pterygoid suture.

Subtaxa
Paracryptodira includes these taxa, after Joyce and Rollot, 2020.

 Dinochelys
 Family: †Compsemydidae
 Calissounemys Var, France, Late Cretaceous (Campanian)
 Compsemys Late Cretaceous-Paleocene North America, Europe
 Kallokibotion?
 Peltochelys Sainte-Barbe Clays Formation, Belgium, Early Cretaceous (Barremian)
 Riodevemys Villar del Arzobispo Formation, Spain, Late Jurassic (Tithonian)
 Selenemys Lourinhã Formation, Portugal, Late Jurassic (Kimmeridgian)
 Tongemys Purbeck Group, England, Early Cretaceous (Berriasian)
 †Uluops
 †Baenoidea
 Family: †Baenidae
 Family: †Pleurosternidae
 Family: Helochelydridae?
Dubious species:

 Species: †Polythorax missuriensis
 Species: †Desmemys bertelmanni
 Species: †Glyptops caelatus
 Species: †Glyptops pervicax
 Species: †Probaena sculpta
The oldest possible record of paracryptodires is from the Forest Marble Formation of England, dating to the Bathonian stage of the Middle Jurassic.

References

Sources
  (1975): A phylogeny and classification of higher categories of turtles. Bulletin of the American Museum of Natural History 155(5): 387–436. PDF fulltext
  (2007): Phylogenetic relationships of Mesozoic turtles. Bulletin of the Peabody Museum of Natural History 48(1): 3–102. DOI:10.3374/0079-032X(2007)48[3:PROMT]2.0.CO;2 HTML abstract

External links
 Testudines

 
Jurassic first appearances
Cretaceous turtles
Eocene genus extinctions
Taxa named by Eugene S. Gaffney